From The Cradle To The Grave - The Unauthorised Biography is an unofficial Cradle of Filth biography that covers the band's history up until the 2000 album of Midian. It features two of the band's key members when Cradle of Filth debuted, as well as the band's original recording studio, Cacophonous Records.

DVD Features

Blurb 
Bursting onto the scene in 1994 from the backwaters of rural suffolk on the east coast of England, Cradle of Filth have achieved worldwide respect and recognition paralleled only by the controversy, rage and hatred they have equally attracted throughout their chequered career to date. From the Cradle to the Grave investigates how this strange collective came to exist, what motivates them to continue and suggests where they might be going from here.

Content
The complete unauthorised biography of Cradle of Filth was produced in the Czech Republic and features more than forty minutes of interviews with the band and those close to them. It contains exclusive and previously unseen footage and new 'Insider' revelations on the band.

Track list
 Intro/Hell On Earth 
 Ungodly Masters 
 The Devils Child 
 School Daze Revisited 
 Total Demo-Lition 
 Principle Of Evil
 Dark Phaerytales 
 Nightmare Scenario
 Self Expressionists
 Blood Curdling Spirit
 Masters Of Diplomacy
 From The Cradle
 Hiring And Firing
 Nature Of The Beast

Credits 
 Produced by Chrome Dreams
 Running Time – approx. 70 mins
 Runs in all regions

References

Cradle of Filth video albums